Mangelia limata is an extinct species of sea snail, a marine gastropod mollusk in the family Mangeliidae.

Description
The length of the shell attains 9 mm, its diameter 3.5 mm.

(Original description) The small shell is nearly smooth and porcellaneous. The  spire is slightly shorter than the narrow aperture. The protoconch consists of  about 3½ smooth,
convex whorls, the last ½ turn being very finely and closely ribbed. There are 3½ subsequent whorls. Their sculpture consists of narrow, slightly oblique ribs which pass across the spire-whorls from suture to suture and on the body whorl follow down on the anterior canal to its tip. There are 8 ribs on the body whorl. The spaces between the ribs are wide, flat and smooth. The tops and the  sides of the ribs themselves are carved or etched with fine, subobsolete spiral lines. The aperture is linear-elliptical.  The outer lip is somewhat thickened by the last rib, but smooth within. The anterior canal is long and straight.

Distribution
This extinct marine species was found in the Gatun Stage,  Pliocene strata of Costa Rica.

References

External links
 Worldwide Mollusc Species Data Base: Mangelia limata
 Fossilworks : Mangelia ecuadoriana

limata
Gastropods described in 1922